Kevin D. Ritz (born June 8, 1965) is an American former Major League Baseball right-handed pitcher.  Ritz grew up in Bloomfield, Iowa. He is an alumnus of William Penn University  and Indian Hills Community College.

Ritz was drafted by the Detroit Tigers in the 4th round of the 1985 MLB amateur draft. He pitched for the Detroit Tigers (1989–92) and the Colorado Rockies (1994–1998). In 1989, Ritz was honored as Tigers Rookie of the Year.

Ritz had his big break when he joined the Rockies in 1994, where he found some success in his career.  He was a member of the first Colorado Rockies team to reach the playoffs.  This came in the 1995 season.  His best season was in 1996, when he went 17-11 in 213 innings pitched, despite recording a high ERA of 5.28 in hitter-friendly Coors Field and leading the National League in Earned Runs Allowed (125).  That year he won 10 games before the All Star break; the only other Rockies pitchers to have done that through 2010 are Shawn Chacón (2003), Aaron Cook (2008), Jason Marquis (2009), and Ubaldo Jiménez (2010).

Ritz was an excellent fielding pitcher in his major league career. In 753.1 innings pitched in 151 games, he committed only two errors in 211 total chances for a .991 fielding percentage.

References

External links

1965 births
Colorado Rockies players
Detroit Tigers players
New Haven Ravens players
Lakeland Tigers players
Colorado Springs Sky Sox players
Toledo Mud Hens players
Glens Falls Tigers players
Gastonia Tigers players
Living people
Indian Hills Falcons baseball players
William Penn Statesmen baseball players
Major League Baseball pitchers
Baseball players from New Jersey
People from Eatontown, New Jersey
Sportspeople from the New York metropolitan area
People from Bloomfield, Iowa
Baseball players from Iowa
Alaska Goldpanners of Fairbanks players